Rear admiral (abbreviated as RADM) is the third-highest active rank of the Royal Australian Navy and was created as a direct equivalent of the British rank of rear admiral. It is a two-star rank.

Rear admiral is a higher rank than commodore, but lower than vice admiral. Rear admiral is the equivalent of air vice-marshal in the Royal Australian Air Force and major general in the Australian Army.

Since the mid-1990s, the insignia of a Royal Australian Navy vice admiral is the Crown of St. Edward above a crossed sabre and baton, above two silver stars, above the word "AUSTRALIA". The stars have eight points as in the equivalent Royal Navy insignia. Prior to 1995, the RAN shoulder board was identical to the UK shoulder board. The UK shoulder board changed in 2001.

Rear Admiral Robyn Walker  became the first female admiral in the Royal Australian Navy when she was appointed Surgeon-General of the Australian Defence Force on 16 December 2011.

See also

Ranks of the Royal Australian Navy
Australian Defence Force ranks and insignia

References and notes

Notes

References

Military ranks of Australia
Royal Australian Navy
Australia